The Günz is a river in Bavaria, Germany.

It is formed near Lauben by the confluence of its two source rivers: the Östliche Günz (eastern Günz) and the Westliche Günz (western Günz). It is approx.  long (including its western source river). It flows generally north through the small towns Babenhausen, Deisenhausen, Ichenhausen and Kötz. It is a right tributary of the Danube in Günzburg.

See also
List of rivers of Bavaria

References

 
Rivers of Bavaria
Bodies of water of Günzburg (district)
Rivers of Germany